The 17015 / 17016 Visakha Express is a daily express train of the Indian Railways connecting Secunderabad (SC) to Bhubaneswar (BBS) (previously from Visakhapatnam to Secunderabad, but extended till Palasa, Bhubaneswar), popularized by the 2008 Telugu movie of the same name.  The train numbers are 17015 and 17016. It belongs to the South Central Railway. Train number 17016 leaves  at 1650 hrs and arrives at  the next day at 1525 hrs.  Train number 17015 leaves Bhubaneswar at 0845 hrs and arrives at Secunderabad the next day at 0730 hrs.

This train initially ran between Palasa and Kacheguda as 7615 Visakha Express and Kacheguda - Palasa 7616 Visakha Express until it was rescheduled to run between Secunderabad and Bhubaneswar. This Train is important for the people of bhimavaram and gudivada people. This Train is one of longest distance covered train in telugu states. this train runs ontime and early to its destination so people believe for travel secunderabad on ontime.

Route & Halts

Composition 
The rake consists of 1First AC, 4 AC2 tier coach, 10 AC3 tier coach, 3 sleeper coaches, 2 General sitting , 1 SLR and 1 EOG Car.

Traction
From Visakhapatnam a Visakhapatnam-based WAP-4/WAP-7 locomotive powers the train  till Bhubaneswar and vice versa.

Direction reversal
The train reverses its direction once at;

 .

See also 
Secunderabad Vishakhapatnam Garib Rath Express
Secunderabad Visakhapatnam Duronto Express

Sources
 India-Rail-Info article on Visakha Express

References

Secunderabad Vishakhapatnam Garib Rath Express
Secunderabad Visakhapatnam Duronto Express
Secunderabad Visakhapatnam Vande Bharat Express

Transport in Bhubaneswar
Transport in Secunderabad
Named passenger trains of India
Rail transport in Telangana
Express trains in India